The 1st constituency of the Savoie (French: Deuxième circonscription de la Haute-Savoie) is a French legislative constituency in the Savoie département. Like the other 576 French constituencies, it elects one MP using a two round electoral system.

Description

The 1st constituency of Savoie is in the west of the department and includes the spa town of Aix-les-Bains.

The 1988 election was the only occasion when this seat has elected a candidate from the left. From 1993 to 2017 the seat was represented by centre right deputies, this run was ended by the victory of En Marche! against The Republicans by the narrow margin of 51% to 49% in the second round.

Assembly Members

Election results

2022

 
 
|-
| colspan="8" bgcolor="#E9E9E9"|
|-
 
 

 
 
 
 
 * Horizons candidate not supported by Ensemble alliance.

2017

 
 
 
 
 
 
|-
| colspan="8" bgcolor="#E9E9E9"|
|-

2012

 
 
 
 
|-
| colspan="8" bgcolor="#E9E9E9"|
|-

References

1